Ilmari Taisto Nurminen (born 24 February 1991 in Vammala) is a Finnish politician currently serving in the Parliament of Finland for the Social Democratic Party of Finland at the Pirkanmaa constituency.

In August 2021 Nurminen was nominated as the chair of the Tampere City Council.

References

1991 births
Living people
People from Sastamala
Social Democratic Party of Finland politicians
Members of the Parliament of Finland (2015–19)
Members of the Parliament of Finland (2019–23)